National Highway 310A, commonly referred to as NH 310A is a national highway in  India. It is a spur road of National Highway 10. NH-310A traverses the state of Sikkim in East District and North District in India.

Route 
Tashiview point - Phodong - Mangan.

Junctions  

  Terminal near Tashiview point.

See also 

 List of National Highways in India
 List of National Highways in India by state

References

External links 

 NH 310A on OpenStreetMap

National highways in India
National Highways in Sikkim